The Snipe European Championship is an international sailing regatta in the Snipe class and the most important european competition of the class. It was previously called the Europe and Africa Snipe Class Championship.

It takes place every two years, on alternate years with the World Championship, since 1950, when the first edition was sailed in Santa Margherita Ligure (Italy). The trophy has evolved over the years from 1 representative per country to an open event since 2014.  The trophy is awarded to the fleet of the first European boat.

Champions

References

External links 
Results
2016 Europeans website 
2014 Europeans website
2010 Europeans website

Snipe competitions
Snipe
Recurring sporting events established in 1950